The Johnson House is a historic house at 514 East 8th Street in Little Rock, Arkansas.  It is a -story American Foursquare style house, with a flared hip roof and weatherboard siding. Its front facade is covered by a single-story modillioned shed-roof porch, supported by Ionic columns.  Built about 1900, it is one of a group of three similar rental houses on the street by Charles L. Thompson, a noted Arkansas architect.

The house was listed on the National Register of Historic Places in 1982.

See also
Johnson House (516 East 8th Street, Little Rock, Arkansas)
Johnson House (518 East 8th Street, Little Rock, Arkansas)
National Register of Historic Places listings in Little Rock, Arkansas

References

Houses on the National Register of Historic Places in Arkansas
Colonial Revival architecture in Arkansas
Houses completed in 1900
Houses in Little Rock, Arkansas
National Register of Historic Places in Little Rock, Arkansas
Historic district contributing properties in Arkansas